This is a list of residential buildings at Northwestern University; for a list of other buildings see List of Northwestern University buildings
This list of Northwestern University residences catalogues the on-campus housing options for the university's approximately 15,000 undergraduate and graduate students on the Evanston, Illinois campus.

Residential colleges
These are the residential colleges that are located on the Evanston campus.

Ayers College of Commerce and Industry 
The Thomas G. Ayers College of Commerce and Industry (CCI) is located next to the Henry Crown Sports Pavilion and Aquatic Center (SPAC) and just off of Lake Michigan. Built in 1991, it is divided into four floors, three of which are co-ed. CCI holds an annual Business Symposium, students to discuss business-related issues with  leaders in the field.

Chapin Hall (Humanities Residential College)

Originally built in 1901, Julia A. Chapin Hall became a women's dorm for Northwestern University in 1967. However, in the fall of 1979, Northwestern gave the dorm to the Humanities College, thus establishing the Humanities Residential College at Chapin Hall. One of the smaller dorms, Chapin Hall houses 72 students in the biggest doubles on campus.

Chapin Hall has been renovated but maintained its patterned ceilings, wooden floors, and large stairways. The hall also includes a small library, three kitchenettes, a media lounge, and War Room containing an assortment of board games, a piano, and computers.

Chapin Hall is also known for partnering with Helicon, a literary and arts magazine founded by Chapin alumnae.

East Fairchild (Communications Residential College, CRC)

East Fairchild's focus is mass media, attracting students interested in film, television, radio and journalism. Informal lectures, known as firesides, often feature journalists and filmmakers.

CRC was built in 1981 as part of a $23 million South Campus project, which included the construction of 1861 Sheridan, 1835 Hinman and other residence halls. A $2 million gift from the Sherman Fairchild Foundation helped provide equipment and finance other expenses for the residential college. CRC's equipment includes a radio station, WXRU 640 AM, as well as two movie-screening rooms.

In 1987, a beloved and talented CRC resident, named Will Arnold, died in his sleep due to an arrhythmia. Will had been the college's equipment chair, and a fundraiser was inaugurated in his honor with half the proceeds going to the American Heart Association and half for CRC equipment and events. The fundraiser is called Radiothon, and it spans 50 hours of student-run radio shows. Events include a date auction, drag show, and a goods auction, with items and gift certificates donated by area merchants.

Hobart House (Women's Residential College)
Hobart House is the Women's Residential College, and is home to 50 undergraduate women. It was designed by the architect James Gamble Rogers, using Indiana limestone. It was named in honor of Emily Hatfield Hobart, a Northwestern University alumna who was killed in the civil strife in China in 1928 while serving as a missionary.

Hobart House opened as an all-women's residence hall within the East Sorority Quad in fall 1928. In 1981, the all-women's Allison Residential College, which had been founded five years earlier, moved to Hobart House and changed its name to the Women's Studies Residential College (WSRC). In 1988, the name was changed to the Women's Residential College (WRC) to encourage even broader participation by women.

Jones Fine and Performing Arts Residential College

Jones Residential College is the fine and performing arts residential college, located on the southern edge of campus, directly across the street from Lake Michigan.

Jones was opened in the fall of 1982 as part of the residential college system. The building cost almost $2.5 million to develop, most of the funds coming from Wayne V. and Elizabeth R. Jones, to whom the building was dedicated. The Joneses were alumni of Northwestern from the graduating class of 1923. The facilities of Jones include spaces for photo editing, music recording, sound editing, ceramics studio, art studio, music and theatrical rehearsal rooms, a dance studio, and a performance space.

Public Affairs Residential College (PARC)

The Public Affairs Residential College is a politics and social policy-themed residential college at Northwestern University. It is located in the North Mid-Quads (NMQ) building at 650 Emerson Street in the southern half of campus. PARC has one of the best locations on campus, conveniently located in between main campus and downtown Evanston.

In Fall 2015, PARC relocated from 1838 Chicago Avenue as part of the university's Housing Master Plan. PARC's executive board voted later that year to permanently remain in the recently renovated facility. Before that, North Mid-Quads was notably the freshman year dorm of Duchess of Sussex and School of Communications graduate Meghan Markle.

Residential College of Cultural and Community Studies (CCS)

The College of Cultural and Community Studies is one of the first residential colleges at Northwestern University and also the smallest. Founded in the fall of 1972, CCS was originally called the Urban Studies College. The college's main purpose was to provide a home to students interested in the interaction of diverse cultures and urban communities in the U.S. and abroad. Residents have majors in many different areas but share an interest in cultures and concern for local and global communities. In 2007, CCS won the Northwestern Green Cup, an annual competition among Northwestern undergraduate residences to conserve the most energy. In 2008, 2009 and 2010, CCS was the overall winner of Northwestern's RCB Field Day, an annual competition amongst Northwestern's 11 residential colleges.

Shepard Residential College

Shepard Residential College is one of the two multi-thematic residential colleges at Northwestern University. It is home to 72 students, making it a mid-sized residential college. Located at 655 University Place in a building known as South Mid Quads, Shepard is near downtown Evanston, as well as the southern half of campus.

Shepard Hall was constructed as part of Northwestern's Centennial celebration and was dedicated in November 1952 as an addition to the women's quadrangles. The original building was made possible by a donation from Mrs. Margaret Bowen Shepard to honor her husband and sister (who was the dean of women at Northwestern). Shepard began as a women's residence hall, but became a multi-thematic, coeducational residential college in 1972. In 2015, the Residential College permanently moved from its old home at 626 University Place to its new one in what used to be the South Mid-Quads building at 655 University Place.

Shepard Residential College offers a classroom, TV lounge, study lounge, and a meeting room. The TV Lounge is equipped with a big-screen television, gaming consoles, a ping-pong table, and a foosball table. Additionally, Shepard has a full kitchen and laundry room for students to utilize.

The Residential College holds a number of events for its residents. These include fireside chats, where faculty and students give presentations about topics that they're passionate about. Shepard also hosts frequent game nights, movie nights, and culinary events.

Slivka Residential College for Science and Engineering

Slivka Hall was built in 2002 as Northwestern's residential college devoted to science and engineering. It was named after Ben Slivka, a Northwestern graduate of 1982 who headed Microsoft's Internet Explorer team up to version 3.0. Slivka is located on the northern part of campus. It lies between CCI and the fraternities. The nearest dining hall is Elder Hall.

While predominantly made up of engineers and scientists, the Slivka community includes students from all six the Northwestern University schools. It is organized into suites by gender and has an unusually high retention rate of upperclassmen in comparison to its sister residential colleges. Slivka frequently invites professors and other Northwestern faculty, such as James Fraser Stoddart, to speak on subjects ranging from nanotechnology to the economics of the internet to social scandals in Elizabethan England. Slivka also hosts semiweekly professor-to-peer (P2P) lunches, where Slivka fellows are invited to join the residents for lunch at Sargent Hall, and quarterly student-fellow receptions in which the fellows join the residents for a catered meal.

Slivka has four floors and a basement. The basement houses the Discovery Room (a room containing computers, printers, and other assorted technology), and a bike room, music room, and laundry room. The first floor connects to a store called Lisa's Cafe, and the second floor has a recreation lounge. All the floors contain suites and a fully equipped kitchen.

West Fairchild (International Studies Residential College)
1861 Sheridan Road

Willard Residential College was built as an all-female dormitory in 1938. The dorm was originally named Willard Hall after Frances Willard, a women's suffragist and leader in the temperance movement who served as Northwestern's first dean of women in the early 1870s. It became the first co-ed housing on campus in 1970, and it was renamed Willard Residential College in 1972 when the dorm became a part of Northwestern's newly inaugurated Residential College program. Willard is the largest residential college at Northwestern University.

Notable Willard fellows include current Faculty Chair Gary Saul Morson and Irwin Weil. Notable alumni include Shelley Long, Julia Louis-Dreyfus, J. P. Manoux, Seth Meyers,  David Schwimmer, Nicole Sullivan, Dave Revsine, Richard Kind, and Stephen Colbert.

Residence Halls

1835 Hinman 
1835 Hinman Avenue

Allison Hall
1820 Chicago Avenue.

Bobb Residence Hall
2305 Sheridan Road

Elder Residence Hall
2400 Sheridan Road

Foster House Residence Hall
2253 Sheridan Road
This house came under scrutiny after an alcohol-related death of Matthew Sunshine in 2008, a freshman resident.

Foster Walker Complex
1927 Orrington Ave

Goodrich House Residence Hall
2321 Sheridan Road

Hinman House Residence Hall
610 Lincoln Street

Interfaith Living and Learning Community
Located on the fifth floor of 1835 Hinman, this residence hall is also known as Interfaith Hall.

Kemper Residence Hall
2420 Campus Drive

McCulloch Residence Hall
2315 Sheridan Road

North Mid-Quads Residence Hall
650 Emerson Street, North Mid-Quads (NMQ) houses the Public Affairs Residential College (formerly in 1838 Chicago Ave).

Rogers House Residence Hall
647 University Place

Sargent Residence Hall
2245 Sheridan Road

Shapiro Hall (Formerly known as 560 Lincoln)
560 Lincoln St. Students often refer to it as "Hotel Lincoln", since it is the newest hall and has exceptional common spaces and amenities.

South Mid-Quads Residence Hall
655 University Place

Fraternities

Alpha Epsilon Pi 

584 Lincoln Street

Alpha Phi Alpha

Chi Phi

Suspended

Chi Psi

Suspended

Delta Chi

619 Colfax Street

Delta Tau Delta

2317 Sheridan Road

Delta Upsilon

2307 Sheridan Road

Kappa Alpha Psi

Lambda Chi Alpha

2339 Sheridan Road

Lambda Phi Epsilon

Omega Delta Phi

Phi Beta Sigma

Phi Delta Theta

2347 Sheridan Road

Phi Gamma Delta

2331 Sheridan Road

Phi Kappa Psi

2247 Sheridan Road

Pi Kappa Alpha

2313 Sheridan Road
Website

Phi Mu Alpha

626 Emerson Street

Sigma Alpha Epsilon

2325 Sheridan Road (headquarters in Evanston)

Sigma Chi

2249 Sheridan Road (headquarters in Evanston)

Sigma Phi Epsilon

2341 Sheridan Road

Theta Chi

572 Lincoln Street

Zeta Beta Tau

576 Lincoln Street

Sororities

Alpha Chi Omega 
 
637 University Place

Alpha Kappa Alpha

Alpha Phi
 
701 University Place (headquarters in Evanston)

Chi Omega

1870 Orrington Avenue

Delta Delta Delta
 
625 University Place

Delta Gamma
 
618 Emerson Street

Delta Sigma Theta

Delta Zeta
 
717 University Place

Gamma Phi Beta
 
640 Emerson Street

Kappa Alpha Theta
 
619 University Place

Kappa Delta
 
711 University Place

Kappa Kappa Gamma
 
1871 Orrington Avenue

Kappa Phi Lambda

Lambda Theta Alpha

Pi Beta Phi
 
636 Emerson Street

Sigma Lambda Gamma

Sigma Alpha Iota

720 Emerson Street

Zeta Phi Beta

Zeta Tau Alpha

710 Emerson Street

References

External links
 The Office of Residential Colleges
 Residential College Board

Northwestern University
Northwestern University residences
Buildings and structures in Evanston, Illinois
Northwestern University residences
Northwestern University residences